The 1989 Atlanta Journal 500 was a NASCAR Winston Cup Series racing event that took place on November 19, 1989, at Atlanta International Raceway in Hampton, Georgia. This was the first Cup race after the fall of the Berlin Wall.

Five of the most dominant drivers of the 1989 NASCAR Winston Cup Series season were Dale Earnhardt (average finish 10th place), Rusty Wallace (average finish 10th place), Mark Martin (average finish 11th place), Darrell Waltrip (average finish 12th place), and Bill Elliott (average finish of 13th place).

Background
Atlanta International Raceway (now Atlanta Motor Speedway) is one of ten current intermediate track to hold NASCAR races; the others are Charlotte Motor Speedway, Chicagoland Speedway, Darlington Raceway, Homestead Miami Speedway, Kansas Speedway, Kentucky Speedway, Las Vegas Motor Speedway, New Hampshire Motor Speedway, and Texas Motor Speedway. However, at the time, only Charlotte and Darlington were built with New Hampshire just under construction.

The track's turns are banked at twenty-four degrees, while the front stretch, the location of the finish line, and the back stretch are banked at five.

Race report
It took three hours and thirty-six minutes to complete this 328-lap event in front of 78,000 people. Dale Earnhardt managed to defeat Geoffrey Bodine by nearly 26 seconds. Eight drivers failed to qualify for this race. There were four accidents and two debris-related incidents; causing 11% of the race to be run under a caution flag. The average duration of laps under the green flag was almost 42 laps.

Grant Adcox crashed heavily on lap 198 of the event and died of major chest and head injuries, also suffering a heart attack as result of the crash. Upon investigation, it was determined that the severe impact had torn his improperly mounted racing seat away from its mount entirely, and this led to Adcox's death. It also led to new safety regulations on the way seats were mounted for the 1990 season.

Earnhardt was the winner of $81,700 ($ when adjusted for inflation) while last-place finisher Phil Parsons walked away with $4,525 ($ when adjusted for inflation). Three drivers had a chance to win a championship: Rusty Wallace, Mark Martin, and Dale Earnhardt. Earnhardt was the only one who had won a title (doing so three times, but his chances took a hit with a series of bad finishes in North Carolina), while Martin and Wallace were looking for their first. Wallace led Martin by 78 points while Earnhardt was a point behind Martin; Wallace needed to finish 18th or better to win the title. Earnhardt started 3rd, Wallace started 4th, while Martin started 20th.

Ultimately, Earnhardt would essentially dominate wire-to-wire for the race, leading 294 of 328 laps to close out the 1989 NASCAR Winston Cup Series season. Dale Earnhardt led almost every lap with the exception of two runs which were led by other drivers on contrary pit strategies, Dick Trickle and Ken Schrader. Martin would finish 30th due to a blown engine, but he would finish 3rd in the final standings; over the next ten seasons, he would finish in the top five eight times.  Rusty Wallace would clinch the championship in this race with a 15th place finish despite losing laps and a flat tire that had put him in 33rd at one point in the race.. It was the first and only Winston Cup Series championship that Wallace would win.

On an unrelated note, this was the last race for Hollywood director Hal Needham's Mach 1 Racing team (the team was sold to Travis Carter, who turned it into Travis Carter Motorsports), as Rick Mast's #66 Chevy suffered a blown motor on lap 213.  This race would also result in the last top-ten finish for Neil Bonnett.

Drivers who failed to qualify for the race were Bill Meacham, Eddie Bierschwale, Tracy Leslie, J.D. McDuffie, Jerry O'Neil, Patty Moise, Norm Benning, and Jimmy Means.

Top ten finishers

Timeline
Section reference: 
 Start of race: Alan Kulwicki started the race with the pole position but quickly lost it to Ken Schrader
 Lap 2: Dale Earnhardt took over the lead from Ken Schrader before losing it to Davey Allison on lap 53
 Lap 13: Caution due to Rodney Coombs' accident, ended on lap 15
 Lap 56: Dick Trickle took over the lead from Darrell Waltrip before losing it to Ricky Rudd on lap 85
 Lap 59: Caution due to a three-car accident, ended on lap 64
 Lap 84: Caution due to debris on the backstretch, ended on lap 87
 Lap 89: Dale Earnhardt took over the lead from Ken Schrader before losing it back to Ken Schrader on lap 141
 Lap 146: Dale Earnhardt took over the lead from Ken Schrader before losing it to Sterling Marlin on lap 228
 Lap 172: Caution due to Rob Moroso's accident, ended on lap 176
 Lap 204: Caution due to Grant Adcox's accident, ended on lap 214
 Lap 227: Caution due to Mark Martin spilling oil on the track, ended on lap 232
 Finish: Dale Earnhardt was officially declared the winner of the event

Standings after the race

References

Atlanta Journal 500
Atlanta Journal 500
NASCAR races at Atlanta Motor Speedway